Pikonema is a genus of sawflies belonging to the family Tenthredinidae.

The species of this genus are found in Europe and Northern America.

Species:

Pikonema alaskensis 
Pikonema dimmockii 
Pikonema fujiense 
Pikonema insigne

References

Tenthredinidae